John P. Milton is a meditation and Qigong instructor, author, and environmentalist.  He is the founder of Sacred Passage and the Way of Nature.

He pioneered vision questing in contemporary Western culture in the 1940s. In 1945, at the time he began his sacred solo retreats in the wilderness, vision quests were unknown in the Americas outside Native American culture. He received his M.S. in ecology and conservation from the University of Michigan in 1963. Milton is also known for organizing and leading dozens of expeditions into some of the wildest areas left on Earth, starting in his late teens. A founding father of the environmental movement in the early 1960s, he was a professor of environmental studies and a Woodrow Wilson Center scholar at the Smithsonian Institution. He was one of the first ecologists on staff at the White House as a member of the President's Council of Economic Advisors, and was a founding member of the environmental organization Friends of the Earth.

He is a frequent lecturer and workshop leader, and sought-after meditation and Qi Gong teacher. Thousands of people have sought his instruction since he began teaching in the 1950s. He has developed unique practices for uniting inner and outer nature through training in Buddhist, Taoist, Vedantic, Tantric, and Native American spiritual traditions, and he incorporates T'ai chi and yoga in his work. The book Discovering Beautiful: On The Road To Somewhere includes several sections detailing a student's apprenticeship with John.

His books and articles focus on inner development, Qi Gong and ecology. He recently published the book Sky Above, Earth Below. Devotees of Milton say his programs inspire Earth stewardship by cultivating natural wisdom and an open, loving heart in the wild.

John Milton lives in Crestone, Colorado.

Sources
Milton, John P., Sky Above Earth Below: Study Guide, Sentient Publications, Boulder CO, .
Wilson, Bud and Jennifer Lennon, John P. Milton, Sacred Passages Teachers, retrieved March 2007.

External links
John's work on the Transition United States web site

John P. Milton on Sacred Earth Conference - 1 of 4
 https://www.youtube.com/watch?v=W0oLX-Hf4Dw

John P. Milton on The Value of Solo Time in Nature - 2 of 4
 https://www.youtube.com/watch?v=fTJeO9wT9sg

John P. Milton on Sacred Earth Origins & Sacred Sites 3 of 4
 https://www.youtube.com/watch?v=aOQMTraMdTY

John P. Milton on "Ecological Spirituality" - 4 of 4
 https://www.youtube.com/watch?v=jdnncQiKGpc

Sacred Land: Healing Through Immersion in Nature – John Milton at U of Florida
 http://www.ufspiritualityandhealth.org/assets/wmv/miltonStream.wmv

Night in Nature at Tällberg Forum – John P. Milton & Goran Gennvi
 https://www.youtube.com/watch?v=G_UkDTdt8cU

John Milton's Bus Stop Meditation
 https://www.youtube.com/watch?v=WlFLOfwjHVI

Cultivate Longevity Clip – John P. Milton
 https://www.youtube.com/watch?v=aYErCchAyVI

Develop Qi Strength and Power – John P. Milton
 https://www.youtube.com/watch?v=lMrIjLvPTLA

Cleanse and Build Inner Qi – John P. Milton
 https://www.youtube.com/watch?v=YQ7DrhdKE8U
Get Wild – Nature Quest in Sweden
 https://www.youtube.com/watch?v=vZKYS0I6Ux0

References

Future environments of North America: Transformation of a Continent. (1966).  Eds: F. Fraser Darling &  John P. Milton Garden City, NY:  The Natural History Press.

The Careless Technology: Ecology and International Development (1969).  Eds.  Farvar, M. T., Milton, J. P. Washington D.C.: The Conservation Foundation and The Center for the Biology of 	Natural Systems, Washington Univ.

Milton, John P. 1969.  Nameless Valleys, Shining Mountains: the Record of an Expedition into the Vanishing Wilderness of Alaska's Brooks Range. New York: Walker & Co.

Dasman, R. F., Milton, J. P., & Freeman, P. H. (1973).  Ecological Principles for Economic Development.  NY:  John Wiley & Sons.

Year of birth missing (living people)
Living people
American ecologists
American environmentalists
Qigong practitioners
Smithsonian Institution people
University of Michigan School of Natural Resources and Environment alumni